Eddie Li Yu-yeung is a Hong Kong model and actor.

He made his first appearance in Hearts Of Fencing on TVB in 2003, in which he played a rich kid who thought he was all that because he had so much money, a character that resembles (or probably based on) Tsukasa Domyoji (Dao Ming Si) in Hana Yori Dango (Meteor Garden). In Hearts Of Fencing, his character had a crush on Race Wong, but throughout the series his character changes and he ends up in a couple with Natalie Tong.

Television 
Hearts Of Fencing (2003)
The Academy (2005)
Revolving Doors of Vengeance (2005)
Forensic Heroes (2006)
Heart of Greed (2007)
The Seventh Day (2008)
Forensic Heroes II (2008)
Your Class or Mine (2008)
Last One Standing (2008)
Burning Flame III (2009)
In the Eye of the Beholder (2010)
The Comeback Clan (2010)
Dropping By Cloud Nine (2011)
Only You (2011)
Grace Under Fire (2011)
Relic of an Emissary (2011)
My Sister of Eternal Flower (2011)
Ghetto Justice (2011)
Lives of Omission (2011)
Super Snoops (2011)
Til Love Do Us Lie (2011)
Daddy Good Deeds (2012)
Sergeant Tabloid (2012)
Tiger Cubs (2012)
Witness Insecurity (2012)
The Last Steep Ascent (2012)
The Menu (2015)
Sexpedia (2015)
Karma (2015)
IPCC Files 2015 (2015)
Beyond the Rainbow (2015)
Hidden Faces (2015)

Film 
Infernal Affairs 3

References

External links 
Home Page at tvb.com (in Chinese)

Living people
Hong Kong male television actors
TVB actors
21st-century Hong Kong male actors
Hong Kong male film actors
Hong Kong male models
Year of birth missing (living people)